Mizmar can refer to
Mizmar (instrument)
Mizmar (dance)